Turbo is a 2013 American 3D computer-animated sports comedy film produced by DreamWorks Animation and distributed by 20th Century Fox. The film was directed by David Soren (in his feature directorial debut) from a screenplay he co-wrote with Darren Lemke and Robert Siegel. It stars the voices of Ryan Reynolds, Paul Giamatti, Michael Peña, Snoop Dogg, Maya Rudolph, Bill Hader, Luis Guzmán, Ben Schwartz, Richard Jenkins, Ken Jeong, Michelle Rodriguez, and Samuel L. Jackson. Set in Los Angeles, the film follows an ordinary garden snail Theo/Turbo (Reynolds) who pursues his dream of winning the Indy 500 after a freak accident gives him superspeed.

Soren came up with the idea for the film. He conceptualized Fast & Furious (2001) with snails, and won the competition. DreamWorks Animation bought the idea, and let it "simmer" for more than five years. After Soren and his family moved into a new home with a backyard infested with snails, he pushed for the idea and "got it back on the fast track." For the racing side of the film, Soren was inspired by his six-year-old son's fascination with race cars.

Turbo was theatrically released in the United States on July 17, 2013. It was met with moderate positive reviews, with praise for the animation, humor, and voice acting, but criticized for its lack of originality. This was the first film to not use the News Corporation byline since 20th Century Fox was bought by 21st Century Fox in 2013.  Despite earning $282.5 million on a $127 million budget, the film underperformed at the box office, prompting the studio to take a $15.6 million write-down on behalf of the film. A television series based on the film, titled Turbo Fast, with only Ken Jeong and Mike Bell reprising their roles, was put into production a year before the film's release, and it first aired on Netflix on December 24, 2013.

The film was dedicated to animator Nicholas Sanger Hoppe, who died from complications relating to his brain cancer positive diagnosis before the film was released.

Plot
In a suburban San Fernando Valley tomato garden of Van Nuys in Los Angeles, Theo, self-named "Turbo", is a garden snail who dreams of being a racer, just like his hero, five-time Indy 500 champion Guy Gagné. However, his obsession with racing makes him an outcast in the slow and cautious snail community, and a constant embarrassment to his older brother, Chet.

After nearly getting killed by a lawnmower in an attempt to retrieve a fallen tomato, Theo wanders onto a freeway to admire the traffic and wishes upon a star, which is actually an airplane, that he could be fast. Suddenly, he is sucked into the supercharger of a Chevrolet Camaro, fusing his molecules with nitrous oxide. When he wakes up, he possesses superspeed and other characteristics of a real car. However, his first attempt to try out his new powers ends with him crashing a boy's tricycle into the garden in which many other snails worked at, resulting in him and Chet getting fired from the garden crew.

Chet angrily scolds Theo for his recklessness, and is snatched by a crow, but is pursued and rescued by Theo at a rundown strip mall called "Starlight Plaza". There, they are captured by Tito Lopez, a taco truck driver who works at the Plaza, and are brought to a snail race held by him and his co-workers. Theo wins the race in a matter of seconds, astounding both the humans and snails alike, earning the respect of the snails, led by Whiplash, and firmly establishing the name "Turbo" as his own. Chet, on the other hand, is not happy with his brother's new ability and wants him to return to normal. Tito dreams of reviving Starlight Plaza, with Turbo as a main attraction, much to his brother and coworker Angelo's annoyance. The snails manage to divert and strand a tour bus to see Turbo's superspeed, bringing impressive business. With this success, Turbo convinces Tito to enter him in the Indy 500 as a competitor, and his coworkers agree to put up the entrance fee and accompany them to Indianapolis.

Tito is initially refused entry into the race, but a chance meeting with Gagné allows Turbo to show off his speed, qualifying for the race via achieving a speed of 226 mph, becoming a sensation on social media and forcing the CEO of IndyCar to reluctantly let Turbo compete. The night before the race, after a heated argument with Chet, who is still unwilling to respect his brother's wishes, Turbo sneaks out to meet Gagné, who reveals his true colors by demoralizing him and warning him to back out of the race. In the race the next day, the racetrack and the more experienced competitors leave Turbo in last place. At a pitstop, Whiplash and his crew give Turbo a pep talk, advising him to stop racing like a car. Turbo uses his small size to his advantage and rapidly gains ground, but Gagné resorts to cheating and knocks him against the wall, damaging his shell and weakening his superspeed.

With one lap to go and Turbo in the lead, Gagné drives over debris on the last turn and overtakes Turbo, inadvertently causing a crash involving most of the competitors, including Turbo, who wakes to find his shell punctured and his superspeed gone, causing him to give up and hide in his shell. Surprised at seeing his brother losing hope, Chet, with a change of heart, meets with Whiplash's crew and they encourage Turbo to continue. Turbo, inspired by his older brother's newfound support, resumes the race. Gagné desperately pursues him by dragging his wrecked car, but Turbo narrowly wins and Gagné loses his status.

Starlight Plaza thrives from Turbo's fame, all the businesses become spectacular successes and hold elaborate snail races. Whiplash's crew are given special propulsion aids for their shells, while Chet is the track referee and paramedic, and the garden snails have also received special shells of their own. Turbo discovers that his shell has healed, and his superspeed has returned, now ready to race once again. The film ends with the scene freezing as the snails race toward the camera, screaming with joy.

Voice cast
 Ryan Reynolds as Theo/Turbo, the titular protagonist, a garden snail who dreams of becoming a racer and the next Indianapolis 500 champion and obtains superspeed during a car race.
 Paul Giamatti as Chet, Turbo's older brother.
 Samuel L. Jackson as Whiplash, the leader of the Starlight Plaza Snail crew.
 Michael Peña as Tito Lopez, a "Dos Bros" taco truck driver who finds and befriends Turbo.
 Luis Guzmán as Angelo Lopez, Tito's brother and a "Dos Bros" taco truck driver.
 Bill Hader as Guy Gagné, a French-Canadian Indy 500 champion, and the main antagonist.
 Snoop Dogg as Smoove Move, a flexible snail.
 Maya Rudolph as Burn, a red snail.
 Ben Schwartz as Skidmark, Whiplash's "feisty #2".
 Mike Bell as White Shadow, a white snail.
 Ken Jeong as Kim-Ly, an elderly manicurist at Starlight Plaza.
 Michelle Rodriguez as Paz, a car mechanic at Starlight Plaza.
 Richard Jenkins as Bobby, a shopkeeper at a hobby store in Starlight Plaza who makes custom snail shells.
 Kurtwood Smith as Indianapolis Motor Speedway CEO
 Dario Franchitti as Scottish Anchor, Male Tourist
 Will Power as Australian Anchor. Power’s Verizon car also appears in the film
 Mario Andretti as Indianapolis Motor Speedway Traffic Director
 Paul Page and Chris Parnell as Announcers
 Paul Dooley as Carl, Chet and Turbo’s boss.
 Chris Miller as Tour Bus Driver
 Lloyd Sherr as Spanish DJ

Production
Turbo was directed by first-time director David Soren, who also came up with the idea for the film. The origins of the film lie in a competition DreamWorks Animation organized for all employees to pitch a one-page idea. The night before, Soren conceptualized Fast & Furious with snails, and won the competition. The studio bought the idea, and let it "simmer" for more than five years. When Soren and his family moved into a new home with a backyard infested with snails, he pushed for the idea and "got it back on the fast track." Soren explained why he chose snails: "For me, it was less about trying to make a racing movie and more about finding an underdog that I could really latch onto. I think that a snail is inherently an underdog. It's smashed, eaten by people, the butt of slow jokes around the world. It just seemed loaded with obstacles. Obviously, the opposite of slow is fast, and that's where racing came into the picture." For the racing side of the film, Soren was inspired by his six-year-old son's fascination with race cars.

DreamWorks Animation partnered with Hulman & Company, parent company of the Indianapolis Motor Speedway and Indy Racing League, LLC (the organisation that sanctions the IZOD IndyCar Series) to make the racing as authentic as possible. Dario Franchitti, four-time IZOD IndyCar Series champion, was a technical consultant on the film, giving advice how Turbo should navigate the speed and competition through the eyes of a snail.

Music

On March 22, 2013, Henry Jackman was announced as the film's composer, marking it as the third DreamWorks Animation film that he scored, following Monsters vs. Aliens (2009) and Puss in Boots (2011). The soundtrack was released on July 16, 2013, by Relativity Music Group. The soundtrack with an additional 11 songs was released on the deluxe edition. Snoop Dogg, who voiced Smoove Move in the film, also contributed to the soundtrack with an original song titled "Let the Bass Go", which was played over the closing credits. According to Dogg, the song is "something upbeat that everyone in the house can enjoy. I'm on my old-school rap style there: we took sounds from the Eighties like an 808 bass to give it that 'Planet Rock' and 'Going Back to Cali' feel. It was about paying homage, while at the same time taking the movie to the next level."

Track listing

Release
Turbo had its world premiere on May 20, 2013, at the CineEurope film distributors' trade fair in Barcelona, Spain. It was theatrically released in the United States on July 17, 2013. Turbo was originally scheduled for a July 19, 2013, release, but DreamWorks Animation moved the release up by two days.

In Chile, this film was the first feature film to play in the 4DX motion format, featuring strobe lightning, motion, wind, water sprays, and aroma effects, which premiered at a Cine Hoyts theater in La Reina.

Home media
Turbo was released digitally on October 22, 2013, having in its first week the highest box office to digital unit ratio for DreamWorks Animation. It was released on DVD, Blu-ray, and Blu-ray 3D on November 12, 2013. The Blu-ray and DVD both come with a wind-up Turbo toy. As of April 2015, 7.1 million home entertainment units were sold worldwide.

Video games
A video game based on the film, titled Turbo: Super Stunt Squad, was released on July 16, 2013 on Wii U, Wii, Nintendo 3DS, Nintendo DS, PlayStation 3, and Xbox 360. Published by D3 Publisher, the Xbox 360, PlayStation 3, and Wii U versions were developed by Monkey Bar Games. The Wii, Nintendo 3DS and Nintendo DS versions were developed by Torus Games. In the game, a crew of characters has to perform stunts to build up their skills and win challenges. The game received negative reviews from critics with Metacritic giving the PS3 version a 38/100. It was the last DreamWorks Animation game to be published by D3 Publisher and also the last DreamWorks Animation game to be released on Nintendo DS.

A free mobile game titled Turbo Racing League was developed by PikPok and was released on May 16, 2013, for iOS, Android, and Windows Phone 8 devices. Played as a snail, the game allows players to race against time and collect tomatoes to earn upgrades. Verizon Wireless sponsored a competition with a total of $1 million in cash prizes—the largest sum for a mobile game to date—in which competitors had to achieve daily goals or collect enough tomatoes to unlock access to the weekly contest. The competition, which ran for eight weeks from May 16 through July 7, 2013, awarded the 10 fastest racers of each week up to $25,000, while the winner of the week was invited to the Grand Finale Race Event, which took place in Los Angeles on July 17, 2013, to earn the title of Turbo Racing League Champion and earn $250,000. In its first ten weeks, the game was downloaded more than 20 million times, and was the most downloaded racing application during the time. This game is no longer officially available and can now only be downloaded from 3rd party websites.

Reception

Box office
Turbo grossed $83 million in North America and $199.5 million in other countries for a worldwide total of $282.6 million. The film cost $127 million to produce and DreamWorks Animation spent over $150–175 million to market it. Although the film had one of the lowest grosses in the history of DreamWorks Animation, forcing the company to take a $13.5 million write-down, the Turbo franchise (which includes the Netflix television series Turbo Fast) is still expected to be profitable.

In North America, on its opening day, the film earned $5.8 million in 3,552 theaters. The film went to number 3 in its first weekend with $21.3 million behind The Conjuring and Despicable Me 2, making this the third-lowest all-time opening for a DreamWorks Animation computer-animated film, or adjusted for inflation and 3D prices, the lowest ever for a DWA CG film. Turbos domestic performance was a disappointment for DreamWorks Animation, which had expectation for their films to be "$150 million, $200 million grossing movies." Jeffrey Katzenberg, DreamWorks Animation's CEO, attributed less than expected gross to the bad release date, set in the middle of over-crowded summer marketplace, having an original film compete with five other animated films—by about 100% more than before.

The film opened at number one in 32 territories. It became one of the top dozen animated films of all time in China, Korea, and Venezuela.

On February 25, 2014, Jeffrey Katzenberg announced that the studio would have to take a $13.5 million write-down on the film, claiming that it "fell short of our expectations", particularly in key international markets. This marked the second film in two years that DreamWorks Animation has lost money on, after Rise of the Guardians. On October 29 it was revealed that DreamWorks had taken a further $2.1 million loss on the film, due to its poor performance in international markets.

Critical response
The review aggregator website Rotten Tomatoes gives the film a 67% approval rating based on 114 reviews, with an average rating of 6.1/10. The website's consensus reads: "It's nowhere near as inventive as its off-the-wall premise might suggest, but Turbo boasts just enough colorful visual thrills and sharp voice acting to recommend as undemanding family-friendly fare." Another review aggregation website Metacritic calculated a score of 58 out of 100 based on 30 reviews. The film earned an "A" from general audiences polled by CinemaScore, and an "A+" from audiences under age 18.

Peter Debruge of Variety gave the film a positive review, saying "Co-writer/director David Soren's story offers little that even the average 6-year-old couldn't imagine, though the film's considerable charm comes through via its characters and sense of humor." Chris Nashawaty of Entertainment Weekly gave the film a B, saying "While there's no denying that the film is a harmless, wholesome, and heart-warming ride crafted with polish and skill, it's also so predictable that you'll see every twist in the story driving down Fifth Avenue." Lou Lumenick of the New York Post gave the film three out of four stars, saying "Let's just say there are no surprises here, and that's not necessarily a bad thing in a film that's aimed mostly at the under-10 set. Mercifully, the characters and the comedy are just sophisticated enough to keep their minders from drifting off." Bill Goodykoontz of The Arizona Republic gave the film three out of five stars, saying "There's certainly no harm in seeing 'Turbo.' Competent, pretty funny in places, awfully nice to look at, that sort of thing. There's just not a lot of excitement, though." Rafer Guzman of Newsday gave the film two-and-a-half stars out of four, saying "Turbo has just enough heart to make it to the winner's circle." Claudia Puig of USA Today gave the film two-and-a-half stars out of four, saying "This good-natured but generic animated tale of a puny garden snail with huge dreams has some appealing characters, a few laughs and then devolves into a predictable Tortoise and the Hare spinoff."

A. O. Scott of The New York Times gave the film a mixed review, saying "Even in the absence of originality, there is fun to be had, thanks to some loopy, clever jokes and a lively celebrity voice cast." Betsy Sharkey of the Los Angeles Times gave the film three-and-a-half stars out of five, saying "Honestly, they pretty much had me at racing snails." Linda Barnard of the Toronto Star gave the film two out of four stars, saying "Turbos colourful trek to product placement-littered Indianapolis is as rote as it gets, but little viewers won't care about predictability." David Hiltbrand of The Philadelphia Inquirer gave the film two out of four stars, saying "Let's face it: Kids aren't a very demanding audience. If there's color, movement, and a high quotient of silliness, they're happy." Peter Hartlaub of the San Francisco Chronicle gave the film a negative review, saying "After the originality of the hero, the filmmakers borrow too heavily from other movies; the similarities to Ratatouille and Cars are almost distracting." Laremy Legel of Film.com gave the film an 8.5 out of 10, saying "Turbo is the sort of film that should work extremely well for folks who are interested in it. It lives up to expectations, even often exceeding them, though it's a shame it's unlikely to find much of a cross-over audience."

Colin Covert of the Star Tribune gave the film three out four stars, saying "Turbo isn't a perfect cartoon, but it's so likable that, like its humble hero, you have to root for it." Moira MacDonald of The Seattle Times gave the film three out of four stars, saying "Ultimately, Turbo nicely lives up to its diminutive hero's credo of, "No dream is too big, and no dreamer too small"—a pleasant thought, for people of all sizes." Jen Chaney of The Washington Post gave the film two-and-a-half stars out of four, saying "Turbo is a derivative but nevertheless good-hearted movie that's peppered with enough clever touches to engage adults as well as moviegoers of the smaller, squirmier variety." Joe Neumaier of New York Daily News gave the film three out of five stars, saying "Families who have already raced to Monsters University and Despicable Me 2 will find Turbo an acceptable third-place finisher. A sort of escargot-meets-Cars adventure, it has some sharp vocal turns and remains fun even when its inventiveness runs out of gas." Tom Russo of The Boston Globe gave the film two-and-a-half stars out of four, saying "While Disney seems to actively court entertainment headlines every time it gives us a new princess of color, here there's no fuss, just a fully realized cartoon world that happens to be made up of the places and diverse faces found around an urban strip mall."

Todd McCarthy of The Hollywood Reporter called the film "An attractively designed but narratively challenged, one-note film." David Fear of Time Out gave the film two out of five stars, saying "All Turbo does is give Reynolds, Paul Giamatti, Samuel L. Jackson and Snoop Dogg the easiest paychecks they'll ever make, and its corporate overlords the chance to sell a few toys." Nell Minow of the Chicago Sun-Times gave the film a B+, saying "The movie gets a bit slow, with too much time spent on the human characters, who are dreary and underwritten, compared to the big dreams of the little snail. But the film picks up when the racing snails come back onscreen, thanks to the adorable character design, with expressive use of those googly eyes, and especially to the voice talent." A. A. Dowd of The A.V. Club gave the film a B−, saying "For all its chronic familiarity, the movie has its minor pleasures, many of them visual. Though at this point it's basically a given that a new studio-animated movie will look good, Turbo often looks downright exceptional." R. Kurt Osenlund of Slant Magazine gave the film two-and-a-half stars out of four, saying "As a film about social issues, and simply being yourself, it's commendably progressive, going so far as serving as a kind of coming-out story."

Accolades

Animated series

A flash-animated television series, titled Turbo Fast, debuted exclusively on Netflix on December 24, 2013, when the first five episodes of the first 26-episode season were released, with subsequent episodes following around holidays throughout 2014. As the first original Netflix series for children, it is available in United States and in the 40 countries where Netflix offers its service. Picking up five months after the events of the film, the series follows Turbo and his crew on their worldwide exploits while mastering new stunts and competing with villains. A total of 56 eleven-minute episodes were produced by DreamWorks Animation Television, with production services provided by Titmouse. A large part of the production is outsourced to South Korea, which marks the first time for DreamWorks Animation to outsource to the country. The series is directed by Mike Roush, executive produced by Chris Prynoski, and features Reid Scott as the voice of Turbo, John Eric Bentley as Whiplash, Grey DeLisle-Griffin as Burn, Phil LaMarr as Smoove Move, Amir Talai as Skidmark and Tito, Eric Bauza as Chet, Ken Jeong, who reprises his role of Kim Ly, and Mike Bell, who also reprises his role as White Shadow.

References

External links

 
 
 
 
 
 

2013 films
2010s American animated films
2010s sports comedy films
2013 fantasy films
2013 3D films
2013 computer-animated films
20th Century Fox animated films
20th Century Fox films
American 3D films
American children's animated comedy films
American children's animated fantasy films
American computer-animated films
American sports comedy films
Animated sports films
Animated films about animals
Animated films about auto racing
American auto racing films
DreamWorks Animation animated films
Fictional gastropods
Films adapted into television shows
Films scored by Henry Jackman
Films set in Indiana
Films set in Indianapolis
Films set in Los Angeles
Films with screenplays by Darren Lemke
Indianapolis 500
3D animated films
2013 directorial debut films
2013 comedy films
Films directed by David Soren (animator)
2010s English-language films
Films about wish fulfillment